Lewis Simon Banda (born 16 September 1982 in Tshabalala) is a Zimbabwean sprinter who specializes in the 400 metres.

His personal best time is 44.58 seconds, achieved in May 2004 in Tucson. This is the current Zimbabwean record. The same year he reached the semi-finals of the Olympic Games.

Competition record

External links

1982 births
Living people
Sportspeople from Bulawayo
Zimbabwean male sprinters
Athletes (track and field) at the 2004 Summer Olympics
Athletes (track and field) at the 2008 Summer Olympics
Olympic athletes of Zimbabwe
Athletes (track and field) at the 2002 Commonwealth Games
Commonwealth Games competitors for Zimbabwe
African Games bronze medalists for Zimbabwe
African Games medalists in athletics (track and field)
Athletes (track and field) at the 2007 All-Africa Games